The 1899–1900 season was the 27th Scottish football season in which Dumbarton competed at national level entering the Scottish Qualifying Cup.   In addition Dumbarton played in the Dumbartonshire Cup.

Scottish Qualifying Cup
In their only 'national' competition, Dumbarton were knocked out in the second round of the Scottish Qualifying Cup by Vale of Leven and thus failed to qualify to play in the Scottish Cup for the first time since its inception.

Dumbartonshire Cup
Locally, the Dumbartonshire Cup was played on a league basis for the first time with the top two meeting in the final.  All competing teams finished on 6 points but Dumbarton ended up in third position on goal difference.

Final league table

Friendlies
For the third season running there were no league fixtures, and attractive 'friendlies' were becoming more difficult to arrange.

A dwindling fixture list saw only 11 'friendly' matches played during the season, although this included a creditable draw against Celtic and a match against Aberdeen which celebrated the opening of Pittodrie Park.  In all 4 were won, 1 drawn and 6 lost, scoring 23 goals and conceding 34.

Player statistics

|}

Source:

Reserve team
Dumbarton lost in the first round of the Scottish Second XI Cup to Queen's Park.

References

Dumbarton F.C. seasons
Scottish football clubs 1899–1900 season